Iskra Velinova (born 1953 in Sofia) is a Bulgarian rower.

References 
 
 

1953 births
Living people
Bulgarian female rowers
Rowers from Sofia
Rowers at the 1976 Summer Olympics
Rowers at the 1980 Summer Olympics
Rowers at the 1988 Summer Olympics
Olympic silver medalists for Bulgaria
Olympic rowers of Bulgaria
Olympic medalists in rowing
World Rowing Championships medalists for Bulgaria
Medalists at the 1980 Summer Olympics